Charcot Fan is a deep-sea formation in the Southern Ocean. It lies off the coast of the West Antarctic Ellsworth Land.

It is named after the French polar explorer Jean-Baptiste Charcot (1867–1936). The US Advisory Committee for Undersea Features (ACUF) confirmed the designation in June 1988.

References

Geography of Antarctica